Sven Ulric Adalvard Palme (born May 25, died- May 14, 1977) was a Swedish historian and professor at Stockholm University. He was the son of the historian Olof Palme (1884–1918) and Ola Palme (born Tonow) (1888–1982). His historical research was broad, from Swedish Middle Age to modern political history. The political history was his focus, concentrating on political parties, decision-making processes and key actors in these processes. In the 1930s he was active in the conservative political debate. But eventually he distanced himself from the conservative ideas and became closer to the Social Democratic tradition.

Bibliography 
 Kärleken och hatet - Politiska anteckningar (1935)
 Sverige och Danmark 1596-1611 (doktorsavhandling) (1942)
 Valdemarståget (1946)
 Stånd och klasser i forna dagars Sverige (1947)
 Riksföreståndarvalet 1512 (1949)
 Sten Sture den äldre (1950)
 I den historiska trapetsen (1952)
 Söderköpings riksdag 1595 (1952)
 Vår tids hjältar' (1953)
 Historien och nuet (1954)
 Den gamla goda tiden (1956)
 Gymnasiets samhällslära (1956)
 Kunskap om samhället (1958)
 Vrakplundrare (1958)
 Historia genom kameraögat 1-2 (1958-1959) (tillsammans med Åke Meyerson)
 Kungligt och kvinnligt (1958)
 Kristendomens genombrott i Sverige (1959)
 Karl Staaff och storstrejken 1909 (1959)
 Skottet på operamaskeraden (1962)
 Hundra år under kommunalförfattningarna (red.) (1962)
 Vår längsta statsminister - En bok om Tage Erlander (1963)
 På Karl Staaffs tid (1964)
 Stockholms krigshistoria (1964)
 Skottet i Sarajevo (1964)
 Mannen med järnmasken (1965)
 Målaren och hans modell samt andra kapitel ur sedehistorien (1966)
 Hur Frankrike blev Frankrike (1967)
 Skottet mot Lincoln (1968)
 Mordet på Caesar (1968)

References

 Klas Åmark, "Sven Ulric Palme och hans stora seminarium", i: Per Thullberg, Jarl Torbacke & Klas Åmark (red.), Historier från Frescati. En vänbok till Kerstin Israelsson (1995). 
 Alf W. Johansson, "Sven Ulric Palme 1912-1977 - Kontroversiell historiker och popularisator", i: Ragnar Björk & Alf W. Johansson (red.), Svenska historiker: från medeltid till våra dagar (2009).
 Lars Epstein: "Ett minne från före Frescati" (Dagens Nyheter 19 juni 2012)
 Johanna Annerstedt: Demokrati i förändring (Karlstads universitet 1908)

This article is influenced by the corresponding Swedish article.

1977 deaths
Academic staff of Stockholm University
20th-century Swedish historians